Nothrotheriops is a genus of Pleistocene ground sloth found in North America, from what is now central Mexico to the southern United States. This genus of bear-sized xenarthran was related to the much larger, and far more famous Megatherium, although it has recently been placed in a different family, Nothrotheriidae. The best known species, N. shastensis, is also called the Shasta ground sloth.

Taxonomy, history, and etymology
 
Nothrotheriops fossils were first collected by the University of California's Anthropology Department during an exploration of caves at Potter Creek Cave in Shasta County, California, the fossils dating to the late Quaternary period. These first fossils (UCMP 8422), consisting of an incomplete mandibular ramus lacking teeth of an individual and 14 additional molars, were sent to the University of California Museum of Paleontology where they were described by paleontologist William Sinclair in 1904 as a new species of Nothrotherium, N. shastensis (species name meaning "from Shasta"). 11 years later in 1916, Smithsonian paleontologist Oliver P. Hay named Nothrotherium texanus (species name meaning "from Texas") based on a partial skull that was transferred from Baylor University in Baylor, Texas. The skull had been collected in the Pleistocene strata of Wheeler County, Texas and given to a clergyman who then gave it to university staff in 1901. Many fossils were later referred to the two, but N. shastensis wasn't placed in a new genus until 1954 when it was placed in a new genus, Nothrotheriops ("near slothful beast", due to its similarity to Nothrotherium) by Robert Hoffstetter during a study of fossil sloths. N. texanus was recombined into the genus in 1995, and had many fossils referred to it from Florida, the easternmost occurrence of the genus.

Fossils of the best-known species, the Shasta ground sloth (N. shastensis), have been found throughout western North America, especially in the American Southwest. It is the ground sloth found in greatest abundance at the La Brea Tar Pits. The most famous specimen was recovered from a lava tube at Aden Crater in New Mexico and was found to still have hair and tendon preserved.  This nearly complete specimen is on display at the Yale Peabody Museum of Natural History in New Haven, Connecticut. Numerous dung boluses belonging to Nothrotheriops have also been found throughout the southwestern United States and have provided an insight into the diet of these extinct animals.

This genus's lineage dates back to the Miocene. The ancestors of Nothrotheriops migrated to North America from South America as part of the Great American Interchange during the Blancan, about 2.6 MYA.

Description

It had large, stout hindlegs and a powerful, muscular tail that it used to form a supporting tripod whenever it shifted from a quadrupedal stance to a bipedal one (i.e. Eremotherium).

Paleobiology

Nothrotheriops behaved like all typical ground sloths of North and South America, feeding on various plants like the desert globemallow, cacti, and yucca. It was hunted by various local predators, like dire wolves and Smilodon, from which the sloths may have defended themselves by standing upright on hindlegs and tail and swiping with their long foreclaws, like its distant relative Megatherium, as conjectured in the BBC series Walking with Beasts. The same claws could also been used as tools to reach past the plant spines and grab softer flowers and fruits. Also, the Shasta ground sloth may have had a prehensile tongue (like a giraffe) to strip leaves off branches.

The Shasta ground sloth is believed to have played an important role in the  dispersal of Yucca brevifolia, or Joshua tree, seeds. Preserved dung belonging to the sloth has been found to contain Joshua tree leaves and seeds, confirming that they fed on the trees. It has been suggested that the lack of Shasta ground sloths helping to disperse the seeds to more favourable climates is causing the trees to suffer.

Distribution and habitat

A fossil find had been described from as far north as the Canadian province of Alberta; however, this report is believed to have been mistaken. The genus lived primarily in the southwestern region of the U.S., from the states of Texas and Oklahoma to California; it has also been found in Florida.

The best known historical specimen was found in a lava tube at Aden Crater in New Mexico; it was found with hair and tendon still preserved. The Rampart Cave, located on the Arizona side of the Lake Mead National Recreation Area, has a plentiful amount of the sloth's hair and dung, both of which scientists used for radiocarbon dating to establish when it lived. The most recent credible dates from this and each of about half a dozen other southwestern caves are about 11,000 BP (13,000 cal BP). In addition to North America, fossils assigned to Nothrotheriops sp. have also been found as far south as Argentina's Santa Fe Province.

References

Further reading 
 
 
 Naples, Virginia L. (1987), Reconstruction of Cranial Morphology and Analysis of Function in the Pleistocene Ground Sloth Nothrotheriops shastense (Mammalia, Megatheriidae), Contributions in Science 389, October 1987, Natural History Museum of Los Angeles County
 Schmidt, Gerald D.; Duszynski, Donald W.; Martin, Paul S. (1992), Parasites of the Extinct Shasta Ground Sloth, Nothrotheriops shastensis, in Rampart Cave, Arizona, J. Parasitol., 78(5), 1992, p. 811-816, American Society of Parasitologists

External links 

 Family tree of Megatheriidae
 SDNHM Fossil Mysteries Field Guide, "Ground Sloths"

Prehistoric sloths
Pleistocene xenarthrans
Pleistocene mammals of North America
Prehistoric placental genera
Fossil taxa described in 1954